Therippia is a genus of longhorn beetles of the subfamily Lamiinae, containing the following species:

subgenus Paratherippia
 Therippia affinis Breuning, 1938
 Therippia latefasciata Breuning, 1936
 Therippia mediofasciata Breuning, 1935
 Therippia triloba (Pascoe, 1859)

subgenus Therippia
 Therippia decorata Pascoe, 1865
 Therippia signata (Gahan, 1890)

References

Mesosini